Eupithecia sporobola is a moth in the family Geometridae. It is found in Madagascar.

References

Moths described in 1988
sporobola
Moths of Madagascar